Haplofijia is a genus of flies in the family Stratiomyidae.

Distribution
Fiji.

Species
Haplofijia simplex Bezzi, 1928

References

Stratiomyidae
Brachycera genera
Taxa named by Mario Bezzi
Diptera of Australasia
Endemic fauna of Fiji